Déjà Vu is the third studio album by Latin American boy band CNCO.  The album was released on 6 February 2021 via Sony Music and recorded at The Groove Studio. It is a cover and visual album, composed of classic songs from Latin music from the 1980s and forward, and music videos paying homage to past boy bands.

Critical reception 
Cristina Jaleru of Associated Press stated that the work "weaves a love story in catchy modern rhythms more suitable for the dance floor".

Mitchell Peters of Billboard indicated that "The quintet takes on tracks like Enrique Iglesias’ “Hero” and Sin Bandera’s “Entra En Mi Vida” with a mix of reverence and invention, honoring the originals while utilizing different harmonies to amplify their power".

Sara London of RIFF Magazine said that "The record is a contemplative, yet convivial call to the past; an extended shoutout to the members’ personal histories and cultures".

Track listing 
Track listings adapted from Spotify.

Charts

References 

2021 albums
CNCO albums
Covers albums